Fariduddin is a male Muslim name formed from the name Farid and the qualification ad-Din. It may refer to:

Farīd ud-Dīn, pen-name of Attar Neyshapuri (c. 1145–c. 1221), Persian Sufi poet
Fariduddin Ganjshakar (c. 1180–c. 1270), Punjabi Sufi preacher
Mohammed Fareeduddin, Indian politician

Arabic masculine given names